Jackson Nicoll (born December 1, 2003) is an American  former actor, best known for portraying Billy, the grandson of the title character, in Jackass Presents: Bad Grandpa (2013).

Nicoll is from Seabrook, New Hampshire. His other credits include The Fighter (2010), What's Your Number? (2011), and Fun Size (2012).

Filmography

References

External links 

Living people
2003 births
People from Seabrook, New Hampshire
American male film actors
American male child actors
American male television actors